Mocchie is a frazione of Condove, in Piedmont, northern Italy.

It is a mountain borough located several km north-west from the centre of Condove, along the provincial road nr. 200 leading to Frassinere.

Since July the 8th 1936 Mocchie was a separate comune (municipality), which also encompassed several small villages as Bonaudi, Bellafughera, Castellazzo, Pralesio and Moni.

References

Frazioni of the Province of Turin
Former municipalities of the Province of Turin
Condove